Doris Campbell is an Austrian cross-country skier. She represented Austria at the 1984 Winter Paralympics and at the 1988 Winter Paralympics. She won the gold medal in the women's 4x5 km relay B1-2 event at the 1984 Winter Paralympics and she also won the bronze medal in the women's middle distance 10 km B1 event.

References

External links 
 

Living people
Year of birth missing (living people)
Place of birth missing (living people)
Paralympic cross-country skiers of Austria
Cross-country skiers at the 1984 Winter Paralympics
Cross-country skiers at the 1988 Winter Paralympics
Medalists at the 1984 Winter Paralympics
Paralympic gold medalists for Austria
Paralympic bronze medalists for Austria
Paralympic medalists in cross-country skiing
Austrian female cross-country skiers
20th-century Austrian women